The Puritans is a 2013 short science-fiction film written and directed by Sean Robinson and produced by Paul Warner.

Premise
The Puritans revolves around a soldier who returns from a war to discover that his family has returned to a nineteenth-century life-style in a desperate attempt to escape from the "perversions" of the modern world.

Cast
 Eileen Kearney as Joy Sutton
 Tyler Elliot Burke as Noble Sutton
 Nikki Dillon as Prudence Sutton
 Greg Seel as Ward Sutton
 Elyssa Jakim as Hope Dudley
 Louisa Ward as Julie
 Peter Trojgaard as Ernest Dudley

Awards
 International Short Film Festival "Kharkov Lilac": Grand Prix Award-won (2013)
 Carmarthen Bay Film Festival: Best International Short-won (2013)
 NW Short Film Festival: Best Original Concept-won (2013)
 Vagrant Film Festival: Audience Choice Award-won (2013)
 Melbourne Underground Film Festival: Best Short Film-nominated (2013)
 The Northwest Ohio Film Festival: Outstanding Short Film-nominated, Audience Choice-nominated, Outstanding Direction: Sean Robinson-nominated, Outstanding Actress-Short: Eileen Kearney-nominated, Outstanding Screenplay: Paul Warner & Sean Robinson-nominated (2013)

Festival showings
 Garden State Film Festival
 Naperville Independent Film Festival
 Marbella International Film Festival (Spain)
 Melbourne Underground Film Festival
 Long Island International Film Expo
 Naoussa International Film Festival
 The Rainier Independent Film Festival
 Frederick Film Festival
 San Francisco Frozen Film Festival
 Columbia Gorge International Film Festival
 Underexposed Film Festival YC
 Minneapolis Underground Film Festival
 Studio City Film Festival
 Timecode:NOLA Indie Film Fest
 Internacional de Cine Estudiantil
 The Inigo Film Festival
 The Justice Film Festival
 The Levante International Film Festival

Critical reception
Film Threat gave the film 5 stars.
SBCC Film Reviews

References

External links

 

2013 films
2010s science fiction films
2013 horror films
American horror drama films
American science fiction horror films
American anthology films
American dark fantasy films
2013 directorial debut films
2013 drama films
2010s English-language films
2010s American films